The Yeast Promoter Atlas (YPA) is a repository of promoter features in Saccharomyces cerevisiae.

References

External links
 http://ypa.ee.ncku.edu.tw/ (outdated)

Biological databases
Gene expression
Saccharomycetes